The Rensselaer RP-1 (for Rensselaer Polytechnic design 1) is an American low-wing, single-seat, foot-launchable glider that was designed and produced by the Rensselaer Polytechnic Institute of Troy, New York. It first flew in 1980.

Design and development
The RP-1 was partly funded by NASA and was the first aircraft in Rensselaer's Composite Aircraft Program.

The aircraft is of mixed construction, made from composites, Kevlar and PVC foam. Its  span wing employs a Wortmann FX-63-137 airfoil. The aircraft weighs just  and was intended to be foot-launched. The landing gear consists of a main skid and dual tail skids. The aircraft achieved a 20:1 glide ratio. Only one was completed.

Specifications (RP-1)

See also

References

1980s United States sailplanes
Sailplanes designed for foot-launching
Aircraft first flown in 1980
Low-wing aircraft